Matthew Bates Merullo (born August 4, 1965) is an American former Major League Baseball (MLB) catcher who played for the Chicago White Sox, Cleveland Indians, and Minnesota Twins between 1989 and 1995.

Playing career 
Merullo attended the University of North Carolina, and in 1984 he played collegiate summer baseball with the Harwich Mariners of the Cape Cod Baseball League. He was selected by the Chicago White Sox in the 7th round of the 1986 MLB Draft. He made his major league debut on April 12, 1989 and final game for the Minnesota Twins in 1995.

Personal life 
Born in Winchester, Massachusetts, he is the grandson of MLB player Lennie Merullo. He currently lives in Madison, Connecticut.

References

External links

1965 births
Living people
American expatriate baseball players in Canada
Arizona Diamondbacks scouts
Baseball players from Massachusetts
Birmingham Barons players
Charlotte Knights players
Chicago White Sox players
Cleveland Indians players
Daytona Beach Admirals players
Harwich Mariners players
Iowa Cubs players
Lake Elsinore Storm players
Major League Baseball catchers
Minnesota Twins players
Minor league baseball managers
Nashville Sounds players
Peninsula White Sox players
People from Ridgefield, Connecticut
Vancouver Canadians players